Johanna Sibylla Kraus (née Küsel; 1650 – 1717) was a German printmaker from Augsburg.

Kraus was born in Augsburg as the daughter of Melchior Küsel. She was taught by her father and assisted his pupil Johann Ulrich Kraus, whom she married and continued to work with.

Gallery
Four designs of tapestries after Charles Le Brun, copied from engravings by Sebastien Le Clerc:

References 

 Johanna Sibylla Küsel in the Sandrart project

1650 births
1717 deaths
Engravers from Augsburg
German printmakers
German women artists
Baroque engravers
17th-century engravers
Women engravers
17th-century German women artists